The 50 Most Extreme Places in Our Solar System is a science book by David Baker, professor of physics at Austin College and Todd Ratcliff, a planetary geophysicist at the Jet Propulsion Laboratory.

Translations
The book is currently available in two translations with a third in progress.

 German Extreme Orte
 Korean Extreme Space
 Japanese

Awards and reviews
Reviews have been positive including being awarded Honorable Mention in Cosmology and Astronomy in the 2010 PROSE Awards and named an Outstanding University Press Book for Public and Secondary School Libraries by the Association of American University Presses.

References

External links
 

2010 non-fiction books
Popular physics books
Astronomy books
Belknap Press books